The South East Asia Research is an international quarterly peer-reviewed academic journal covering scholarly studies on all aspects of Southeast Asia within the disciplines of archaeology, art history, economics, geography, history, language and literature, law, music, political science, social anthropology and religious studies. It is published by Taylor & Francis on behalf of SOAS University of London. The editor is Rachel V Harrison. This journal is abstracted and indexed by Scopus.

References 

Southeast Asian studies journals
SOAS University of London
Publications with year of establishment missing
ISSN needed
Quarterly journals